Salem Khalifah (Arabic: سالم خليفة) (born 26 October 1990) is a Qatari footballer. He currently plays for Mesaimeer.

External links

References

Qatari footballers
1990 births
Living people
Al-Shamal SC players
Muaither SC players
Umm Salal SC players
Al-Khor SC players
Al Ahli SC (Doha) players
Al-Markhiya SC players
Mesaimeer SC players
Qatar Stars League players
Qatari Second Division players
Association football forwards